Waldenor Alves Pereira Filho (born 8 March 1954) more commonly known as Waldenor Pereira is a Brazilian politician as well as an economists and university professor. He has spent his political career representing his home state of Bahia, having served as state representative since 2011.

Personal life
He is the son of Waldenor Alves Pereira and Terezinha Ledo Alves Pereira. He holds a postgraduate degree in programming and public budget  from the Federal University of Bahia. He also holds a diploma in advanced studies in Public Management from the Complutense University of Madrid. Before becoming a politician Pereira worked as an economists and university professor. From 1994 to 2002 he was the rector of the State University of Southwestern Bahia.

Political career
Pereira voted against the impeachment motion of then-president Dilma Rousseff. Pereira voted against the 2017 Brazilian labor reform, and would vote in favor of a corruption investigation into Rousseff's successor Michel Temer.

References

1954 births
Living people
Brazilian economists
Brazilian educators
Workers' Party (Brazil) politicians
Members of the Chamber of Deputies (Brazil) from Bahia
Members of the Legislative Assembly of Bahia
People from Bahia
Federal University of Bahia alumni
Complutense University of Madrid alumni